The following outline is provided as an overview of and topical guide to public relations:

Public relations practice of managing the spread of information between an individual or an organization (such as a business, government agency, or a nonprofit organization) and the public.

Nature of public relations 
Public relations can be described as all of the following:
 Academic discipline – branch of knowledge that is taught and researched at the college or university level. Disciplines are defined (in part), and recognized by the academic journals in which research is published, and the learned societies and academic departments or faculties to which their practitioners belong.
 Communication – activity of conveying information
 Marketing – process which creates, communicates, and delivers value to the customer, and maintains the relationship with customers.

Essence of public relations 
 To create and sustain "shared meaning" or "common understanding" - NB this may be and usually is different from "shared beliefs"
 Propaganda: the general propagation of information for a specific purpose
 Psychological warfare:
 Psyops
 Public relations: techniques used to influence the publics' perception of an organization
 Publicity: PR techniques used to promote a specific product or brand
 Spin (public relations)
 Spin: both the objective of a PR campaign and the act of obtaining that objective

Public relations methods and approaches 
 Airborne leaflet propaganda
 Astroturfing and Astroturf PR: fake grassroots
 Atrocity story
 Bandwagon effect
 Big lie
 Black propaganda
 Buzzword
 Card stacking
 Code word
 Communist propaganda
 Corporate image
 Corporate propaganda
 Cult of personality
 Demonization
 Disinformation: providing false information
 Dog-whistle politics
 Doublespeak
 Enterperience: fusing entertainment and experience together
 Euphemisms, as done deliberately to advance a cause or position (see also Political correctness)
 Factoid
 Fedspeak
 Front organization
 Glittering generality
 Homophobic propaganda
 Indoctrination
 Information warfare: the practice of disseminating information in an attempt to advance your agenda relative to a competing viewpoint
 Junk science
 Lesser of two evils principle
 Loaded language
 Marketing: commercial and business techniques
 Media bias
 Media manipulation: the attempt to influence broadcast media decisions in an attempt to present your view to a mass audience
 Misuse of statistics
 News management: PR techniques concerned with the news media
 News propaganda
 Newspeak
 Plain folks
 Propaganda film
 Public service announcement
 Revolutionary propaganda
 Self propaganda
 Social marketing: techniques used in behavioral change, such as health promotion
 Sound science
 Rebuttal: a type of news management technique
 Rhetoric
 Slogan
 Transfer (propaganda)
 Video news release
 Weasel Word
 White propaganda
 Yellow journalism

Theory of public relations
 Agenda-setting theory
 Framing (social sciences)
 Propaganda model: a model developed by Noam Chomsky and Edward S. Herman to explain how propaganda functions in democracies

History of public relations 
 History of public relations

Historical uses of propaganda

By country
 Propaganda in India
 Propaganda in the People's Republic of China
 Propaganda in the People's Republic of Poland
 Propaganda in the Republic of China
 Propaganda in Rwanda
 Propaganda in the Soviet Union
 Propaganda in the United States

Miscellany
 Congregation for the Evangelization of Peoples
 Department for Agitation and Propaganda
 Operation Mockingbird
 Propaganda during the Reformation
 Propaganda in the War in Somalia
 Public relations preparations for 2003 invasion of Iraq
 Role of the media in the Yugoslav wars
 Socialist Propaganda League

World War II
 American propaganda during World War II
 British propaganda during World War II
 Propaganda in the Republic of China
 Soviet propaganda during World War II
 Walt Disney's World War II Propaganda Production

Britain

 
 List of British propaganda films of World War II
 Fougasse
 Ministry of Information

Nazi Germany

People
 Norman Baillie-Stewart (Radio broadcaster, 1939-1942)
 Robert Henry Best (Radio broadcaster, 1942)
 Elsa Bruckmann (Propagandist to industrialists)
 Hugo Bruckmann
 Franz Burri (Disseminator of Nazi propaganda in Switzerland)
 Otto Dietrich (Press chief)
 Constance Drexel (Radio broadcaster)
 Hermann Esser (First Nazi Chief of Propaganda)
 Arnold Fanck (Film director)
 Paul Ferdonnet (Radio broadcaster)
 Walter Frentz (Photographer and film producer)
 Hans Fritzsche (Holder of various posts in the Ministry for Public Enlightenment and Propaganda)
 Walther Funk (State Secretary for the Ministry for Public Enlightenment and Propaganda, 1933–1938)
 Hermann Gauch
 Herbert Gerdes
 Karl Gerland
 Mildred Gillars
 Joseph Goebbels
 Hans F. K. Günther
 Eugen Hadamovsky
 Ernst Hanfstaengl
 Karl Hanke
 Thea von Harbou
 Veit Harlan
 Fritz Hippler
 Heinrich Hoffmann
 Raymond Davies Hughes
 Emil Jannings
 William Joyce
 Fred W. Kaltenbach (Radio broadcaster)
 Emil Kirdorf
 Fritz Julius Kuhn
 Johann von Leers
 Wolfgang Liebeneiner
 Lord Haw-Haw
 Horst von Möllendorff
 Martin James Monti
 Werner Naumann
 Elisabeth Noelle-Neumann
 Wilfred von Oven
 Leni Riefenstahl
 Alfred Rosenberg
 Fritz Rössler
 Gregor Schwartz-Bostunitsch
 Albert Speer
 Julius Streicher
 Eberhard Taubert

Organisations
 Charlie and his Orchestra
 Department of Film
 Gaubildstelle (Office of Slides)
 Ministry of Public Enlightenment and Propaganda (Reichsministerium für Volksaufklärung und Propaganda or Propagandaministerium, or RNVP)

Campaigns and events
 Operation Himmler
 Nuremberg Rallies
 Sportpalast speech

Media

 The Eternal Jew (Fritz Hippler, 1940)
 Triumph of the Will (Leni Riefenstahl, 1935)

Films

Public relations organizations 
 Ad Council
 Bureau of International Information Programs
 Institute for Propaganda Analysis
 Ministry of propaganda
 United States Information Agency
 Shared values initiative - Council of American Muslims for Understanding

Public relations media 
 "Al Fateh"
 America's Army, video game produced by the U.S. government with the stated aim of encouraging players to become interested in joining the U.S. Army.

Works about public relations and propaganda

Books
 Manufacturing Consent: The Political Economy of the Mass Media by Edward S. Herman and Noam Chomsky
 Propaganda by Edward Bernays
 Propaganda: The Formation of Men's Attitudes by Jacques Ellul
 Public Opinion by Walter Lippmann

Film
 Wag the Dog

See also 
 
 
 
 
  (book)

External links 

 Global Alliance for Public Relations and Communication Management
 Stockholm Accords for Public Relations
 Russia (independent) Alliance for Public Relations
 

 1
Public relations
Public relations
Public relations